Nawab Muzaffar Khan (1757 – 2 June 1818) was the last Afghan governor of Multan.

Early life
Nawab Muzaffar Khan was born in 1757 in Multan. He was the eldest son of his father. They were four brothers and one sister. He was well educated in religion, civil administration and warfare. He took part in the affairs of the state in very early age. He was only 18 years old when his father instructed him to lead a mission to Kabul in January 1775. His mission failed but he got the attention of the Afghan King who fixed 5000 rupees as his stipend. He commanded with bravery the Afghan contingent during the siege of Multan in February 1775. When Ganda Singh invaded Shujabad, he defended city with great valour. He realised the greedy nature of the Sikh soldiers and gave them some money. He succeeded his father at the age of 18 in Shujabad on October 18, 1775. Nawab Muzaffar Khan could not get Multan until 1780, when he was reinstated by Timur Shah Durrani, King of Kabul, who expelled the Sikhs and appointed Muzaffar Khan as the Governor (Subedar) of Multan. Timur Shah Durrani also gave him the title of Nawab, at the age of 23.

Military career
In 1817, Maharaja Ranjit Singh sent his army to Multan. The commander of army was Diwan Bhiwani Das. Main purpose of this evasion was to ask Nawab Muzaffar Khan to accept the rule of Sikh Darbar. In 1818, Kharak Singh and Hindu Commander Misr Diwan Chand arms troops lay around Multan without making much initial headway. Maharaja Ranjit Singh sent a large cannon named Zamzama . Though in name, the army was commanded by Kharak Singh but actual command was in the hand of Military genius Misr Diwan Chand.
The Maharaja directed his son to pay full attention to the advice of Misr Diwan Chand

Muzaffar urged the majority of the Muslim population of the city of Multan to fight a war against the Sikhs and Hindus. However, the tactics of Nawab Muzaffar Khan failed as the Sikh armies were able to suppress the revolt of the Multan population. In the battle, Misr Diwan Chand led the Sikh armies to victory over Nawab Muzaffar Khan. Muzzafar Khan and seven of his sons were killed before the Multan fort finally fell on June 2, 1818.

By name of Nawab Muzaffar Khan
Muzaffargarh- Name of Muzaffargarh is on the name of Nawab Muzaffar Khan. Muzaffargarh means Fort of Muzaffar.
 Nawab Muzaffar Khan Park, a park in Muzaffargarh
 Muzaffarabad, Multan, a town near Multan.

See also
 List of Pashtun empires and dynasties
 Sadozai Sultanate of Herat
 Ahmad Shah Durrani
 Durrani Empire

References

1757 births
1818 deaths
Pashtun people
Pashtun dynasties
Durrani dynasty
History of Multan
Emirs of Afghanistan
Afghan expatriates in Pakistan
18th-century Afghan people
19th-century Afghan politicians
Afghan people murdered abroad
People from Muzaffargarh